Point Blank is the self-titled debut album of Canadian hip hop group Point Blank, released August 19, 2008 on Tilt Rock/Koch Entertainment Canada. The album's first single, "Born and Raised in the Ghetto", became a hit in 2007. Other singles include "God Only Knows", "T.O. 2 O.T.", and "Game Got Deep". The album was nominated for Rap Recording of the Year at the 2009 Juno Awards.

Track listing

References

2008 debut albums
Albums produced by Boi-1da
Albums produced by Tone Mason
E1 Music albums
Point Blank (hip hop group) albums